The Kappa Kappa Gamma Sorority House is a historic sorority house located at the University of Illinois at Urbana–Champaign in Urbana, Illinois. The house was built in 1928 for the university's Beta Lambda chapter of the Kappa Kappa Gamma sorority, which was established in 1921. The chapter was historically known for its members' academic achievements and their roles in campus social groups. Ralph E. Milman, an associate of prominent Chicago architect Howard Van Doren Shaw and husband to a member of the sorority, designed the English Revival building. Key features of the design include a steep gable roof with projecting dormers, a rough ashlar limestone exterior, a projecting bay window with leaded glass windows, and a recessed arched entryway.

The house was added to the National Register of Historic Places on February 25, 2004.

References

Residential buildings on the National Register of Historic Places in Illinois
Houses completed in 1928
National Register of Historic Places in Champaign County, Illinois
Sorority houses
Buildings and structures of the University of Illinois Urbana-Champaign
University of Illinois Urbana-Champaign
History of women in Illinois